Tom Hood (19 January 183520 November 1874) was an English humorist, playwright and author. He was the son of the poet and author Thomas Hood. Pen and Pencil Pictures (1857) was the first of his illustrated books. His most successful novel was Captain Master's Children (1865).

Biography

Hood was born at Lake House, Leytonstone, England, the son of the poet Thomas Hood and his wife Jane (née Reynolds) (1791–1846). His older sister was the children's writer, Frances Freeling Broderip. After attending University College School and Louth Grammar School, he entered Pembroke College, Oxford, in 1853. There he studied for the Church and passed all the examinations for the degree of BA, but did not graduate.

At Oxford, he wrote his Farewell to the Swallows (1853) and Pen and Pencil Pictures (1854). He began to write for the Liskeard Gazette in 1856, and edited that paper in 1858 and 1859. In 1861 he wrote Quips and Cranks, and Daughters of King Daher, and other Poems. The next year, he published Loves of Tom Tucker and Little Bo-Peep, a Rhyming Rigmarole, followed in 1864 by Vere Vereker's Vengeance, a Sensation, and in 1865 by Jingles and Jokes for the Little Folks. His novels included A Disputed Inheritance (1863), A Golden Heart (1867), The Lost Link (1868), Captain Masters's Children (1865), and Love and Valour (1872). In 1866 he translated Ernest L'Épine's La Légende de Croquemitaine.

He also wrote two books on English verse composition, several children's books (in conjunction with his sister, Frances Freeling Broderip), and a body of magazine and journal articles. Hood drew with considerable facility, and illustrated several of his father's comic verses, some of which were collected in his father's book, Precocious Piggy.

Meanwhile, in 1860, the younger Hood obtained a position in the War Office, which he served for five years. In 1865 he left the War Office when selected as editor of Fun Magazine, a Victorian weekly magazine which became very popular under his direction.  In 1867, he first issued Tom Hood's Comic Annual, not to be confused with the similarly-named Comic Annual that had been published in 1830 through 1842 by his father, the senior Thomas Hood (who, by then, had already died).

In private life, Hood's geniality and sincere friendliness secured him the affection and esteem of a wide circle of acquaintance. Some of these friends became contributors to his publications. For example, he befriended the dramatist W. S. Gilbert and the American journalist Ambrose Bierce, both frequent contributors to Fun. Hood wrote the burlesque, Robinson Crusoe; or, The Injun Bride and the Injured Wife (1867), together with Gilbert, H. J. Byron, H. S. Leigh and Arthur Sketchley. Hood's Fun gang also included playwright Thomas W. Robertson, among others.

Hood's first wife, Susan, (on occasion called "Mrs Tom"), died in 1873, at the age of only thirty-seven. He married Justine Rudolphine Charotton (b. 1844/5) on 15 August 1874, only a few months before his own death.

Hood died suddenly in his cottage at Peckham Rye, Surrey on 20 November 1874 and was buried in Nunhead cemetery.

Controversy over Alice in Wonderland
In 1887 the literary critic Edward Salmon suggested that Lewis Carroll had plagiarised Hood's From Nowhere to the North Pole (1875) when writing Alice:

Carroll replied a month later, in a terse letter to editor of The Nineteenth Century:

In 1889 Carroll even inserted an announcement in the back of The Nursery "Alice", correcting his previous explanation and further denying Tom Hood's influence:

Legacy and honours
 British dramatist Thomas W. Robertson dedicated his play Society (1864) to Hood — "To my dear friend Tom Hood this play is dedicated."
 His sister, Frances Freeling Broderip, wrote a memoir of him that was published with an 1877 edition of his poems.
 Ambrose Bierce's short story "The Damned Thing" was inspired by an alleged encounter with Tom Hood's spirit.
 In 1925, Tom Hood School in Leytonstone was renamed after Hood.

Notes

References

External links

 
 
 

1835 births
1874 deaths
Children's fantasy novels
English fantasy writers
English illustrators
English male poets
People educated at University College School
English male short story writers
English short story writers
English male novelists
19th-century British short story writers